Keren Ann Zeidel ( born 10 March 1974), known professionally as Keren Ann, is an Israeli-born singer, songwriter, composer, producer, and engineer based largely in Paris, Tel Aviv, and New York City. She plays guitar, piano, and clarinet. She also engineers and writes choir and musical arrangements.

Early life
Keren Ann Zeidel was born in Caesarea, Israel, to a Russian-Jewish father and a Dutch-Javanese mother. She lived in Israel and in the Netherlands until the age of 11, when her family moved to Paris.

Career

Keren Ann has released eight solo albums: La Biographie de Luka Philipsen (2000), La Disparition (2002), Not Going Anywhere (2003), Nolita (2005), Keren Ann (2007), 101 (2011), You're Gonna Get Love (2016) and Bleue (2019). Many of her songs have been covered by other artists, including Henri Salvador, Jane Birkin, Francoise Hardy, Rosa Passos, Jacky Terasson, Emmanuelle Seigner, Benjamin Biolay and Anna Calvi. Her music has been featured in TV series including Grey's Anatomy, Six Feet Under and Big Love, and in movies including Love Me No More (2008). Her song "Beautiful Day" has been the sound of the "Skyteam" campaign, and in 2008 her song "Lay Your Head Down" was the synch for the international H&M Spring commercial.

Keren Ann and Icelandic musician Barði Jóhannsson formed the musical duo "Lady & Bird"; the two released a self-titled studio album in 2003, as well as a live recording of their performance with the Iceland Symphony Orchestra in 2009.

Keren Ann co-wrote Henri Salvador's 2000 album Chambre Avec Vue, and wrote the lyrics for Sophie Hunter's 2005 debut album Isis Project, to music written by Guy Chambers. In 2008, Keren Ann composed, with Tibo Javoy, the entire sound design for the European TV channel Arte. She co-wrote and co-produced, with Doriand, Emmanuelle Seigner's 2010 album Dingue.

She also contributed six songs to the Israeli film Yossi (2012), directed by Eytan Fox, as well as appearing onscreen as herself, performing a music concert.

Personal life
Although she has lived and recorded mostly in France and the US, Keren Ann retains her Dutch and Israeli citizenship. She is fluent in English, Hebrew, and French.

In July 2012, Keren Ann gave birth to her first child, Nico.

Discography

Studio albums

Collaborations and scores
 Chambre Avec Vue with Henri Salvador at Source-Virgin France (2000)
 Lady and Bird, with Bardi Johannsson at Labels (2003)
 Isis Project with Guy Chambers and Sophie Hunter at Sleeper Music UK (2004)
 ARTE New Sound with Tibo Javoy
 La Ballade of Lady & Bird with Icelandic Symphonic Orchestra at EMI
 Dingue for Emmanuelle Seigner with Doriand at Sony Music France
 Thelma, Louise et Chantal original score
 Red Waters, opera, with Bardi Johannsson (2011)
 "Soleil Bleu" / Sylvie Vartan @ Sony Music France (2011)

TV soundtracks 
 Grey's Anatomy ("Not Going Anywhere")
 Skyteam Advertisement ("Beautiful Day")
 Six Feet Under ("Jardin D'hiver")
 Big Love ("L'onde Amere")
 The L Word ("Do What I Do") (Lady & Bird)
 TGV Advertisement ("Malmo Lives") (Lady & Bird)
 H&M Advertisement ("Lay Your Head Down")
 Daewoo Motor Sales Iaan Advertisement ("Right Now & Right Here")
 Orange Advertisement ("Lay Your Head Down")
 Galia Advertisement ("Right Now & Right Here")
 Nurse Jackie ("My Name is Trouble")
 Normal People ("Strange Weather")

References

External links 

Interview, The Observer, 3 April 2011
"A Clear View", New Yorker profile by Sasha Frere-Jones

1974 births
21st-century Dutch women singers
21st-century Dutch singers
21st-century Israeli women singers
21st-century Israeli women writers
21st-century women engineers
Blue Note Records artists
Capitol Records artists
Dutch people of Javanese descent
Dutch people of Russian-Jewish descent
Dutch pop singers
Dutch women engineers
Dutch women singer-songwriters
English-language singers from Israel
Israeli audio engineers
Israeli people of Dutch descent
Israeli people of Javanese descent
Israeli people of Russian-Jewish descent
Israeli pop singers
Israeli record producers
Israeli women engineers
Israeli women record producers
Israeli women singer-songwriters
Knights of the Ordre national du Mérite
Living people
Musicians from New York City
Musicians from Paris
People from Caesarea, Israel
People from Tel Aviv
Polydor Records artists
Officiers of the Ordre des Arts et des Lettres
Women audio engineers